Nikolay Alexandrovich Dubasov (28 September 1869 — 4 April 1935) was a Russian pianist and music teacher.

1869 births
1935 deaths
Russian classical pianists
Male classical pianists
Russian music educators